Airtable is a cloud collaboration service headquartered in San Francisco. It was founded in 2012 by Howie Liu, Andrew Ofstad, and Emmett Nicholas.

Airtable is a spreadsheet-database hybrid, with the features of a database but applied to a spreadsheet. The fields in an Airtable table are similar to cells in a spreadsheet, but have types such as 'checkbox', 'phone number', and 'drop-down list', and can reference file attachments like images.

Users can create a database, set up column types, add records, link tables to one another, collaborate, sort records and publish views to external websites.

History

2015 
 February 2015: Raised $3 million from Caffeinated Capital, Freestyle Capital, Data Collective, CrunchFund.
 April 2015: Airtable launches its API and embedded databases.
 May 2015: Raised $7.6 million funding from Charles River Ventures and Ashton Kutcher.
 July 2015: Introduced Airtable Forms to collect and organize data.
 August 2015: Airtable made "Add to Slack" option available to integrate Airtable with Slack. 
 December 2015: Airtable redesigned its iOS app.
 December 2015: Airtable introduced barcode as new field type.

2018 
 March 2018: Raised $52 million in Series B funding; announced the launch of Airtable Blocks.
 November 2018: Raised $100 million in Series C funding.

2020 
September 2020: Raised $185 million in Series D funding.

2021 
 March 2021: Raised $270 million in Series E funding; funding was led by Greenoaks  and also included WndrCo, Caffeinated Capital, CRV, and Thrive.
 December 2021: Airtable raised $735 million in a Series F funding round that boosted its valuation to $11 billion.

2022 
 December 2022: Airtable CEO and co-founder Howie Liu informed employees that a fifth of them would be laid off, stating: “In trying to do too many things at once, we have grown our organization at a breakneck pace over the past few years....We will continue to emphasize growth, but do so by investing heavily in the levers that yield the highest growth relative to their cost.” Three months prior to this announcement, Liu purchased a $31 million house in Beverly Hills.

See also 
 Cloud collaboration
 Document collaboration
 Collaborative software
 Collaborative real-time editor
 USAFacts

References 

Cloud computing providers
Software companies based in the San Francisco Bay Area
Software companies of the United States
Software companies established in 2012
Software companies based in California
Cloud applications
2012 establishments in California
American companies established in 2012